Alinci is a small village in the municipality of Mogila, North Macedonia. It is between Mogila and Musinci that spreads from the Bitola to the Prilep provence. It used to be part of the former municipality of Dobruševo.

There is a small population in Alinci and a small number of houses than there once were with a bigger population. Alinci also has much produce in the farms such as fruit, vegetable and tobacco. Alinci now has a smaller living population and has more crops growing within the area.

Demographics
According to the 2002 census, the village had a total of 57 inhabitants. Ethnic groups in the village include:

Macedonians 57

References

Villages in Mogila Municipality